Luteolin-7-O-glucuronide is a chemical compound that is classified as a flavone.

It is found in Acanthus hirsutus and in rye (Secale cereale).

Metabolism 
Luteolin 7-O-glucuronosyltransferase is an enzyme that uses UDP-glucuronate and luteolin to produce UDP and luteolin 7-O-beta-D-glucuronide.

Luteolin-7-O-glucuronide 2"-O-glucuronosyltransferase is an enzyme that uses UDP-glucuronate and luteolin 7-O-beta-D-glucuronide to produce UDP and luteolin 7-O-(beta-D-glucuronosyl-(1→2)-beta-D-glucuronide).

References 

Flavone glycosides
Flavonoid glucuronides
Glucuronide esters